Jhok Ditta railway station is located in Pakistan.

See also
 List of railway stations in Pakistan
 Pakistan Railways

References

External links

Railway stations in Faisalabad District
Railway stations on Shorkot–Sheikhupura line